Amewu Mensah (born 21 March 1977) is a German high jumper of Ghanaian descent.

At the 1999 World Championships she reached the final, but failed to clear the opening height there. In June 2000 in Rehlingen she achieved a career best jump of 1.94 metres. Two months later she finished eighth at the 2000 Olympics, equalling her personal best result.

She became German champion in 2000 and won her only national indoor medal in the same year, a silver medal. She represented the clubs TSV Bayer 04 Leverkusen and OSC Berlin.

In June 2001, again in Rehlingen, she tested positive for the anabolic steroid oxandrolone. She received a suspension from the sport which lasted between July 2001 and July 2003.

See also
List of sportspeople sanctioned for doping offences

References

1977 births
Living people
German sportspeople of Ghanaian descent
German female high jumpers
Athletes (track and field) at the 2000 Summer Olympics
Olympic athletes of Germany
World Athletics Championships athletes for Germany
German sportspeople in doping cases
Doping cases in athletics
LG Bayer Leverkusen athletes
OSC Berlin athletes